Horobets, also transliterated Gorobets, is a surname meaning "sparrow" in Ukrainian. Notable people with the surname include:
 Ruslan Gorobets (1956–2014), Ukrainian-Russian musician
 Yuri Gorobets (born 1932), Russian actor
 Vita Horobets (born 1996), Ukrainian basketball player

See also
 
 

Ukrainian-language surnames